Throw the Dice is the second studio album by Spanish singer and songwriter Barei. It was released in Spain on the April 7, 2015 and was re-released on April 22, 2016. The album reached number 28 on the Spanish Albums Chart. The album includes the singles "Another's Life", "Foolish NaNa", "Wildest Horses", "You Fill Me Up (My Yang)" and "Say Yay!".

Singles
"Another's Life" was released as the lead single from the album on March 18, 2013. "Foolish NaNa" was released as the second single from the album on October 7, 2013. "Wildest Horses" was released as the third single from the album on April 24, 2014. The song peaked at number 36 on the Spanish Singles Chart. "You Fill Me Up (My Yang)" was released as the fourth single from the album on November 19, 2014. "Say Yay!" was released as the lead single from the re-released album on January 25, 2016. The song peaked at number 3 on the Spanish Singles Chart. The song also charted in France and Sweden. The song represented Spain in the Eurovision Song Contest 2016, in Stockholm, Sweden. In the grand finale that was held May 14, 2016, she had received 77 points at the end of the voting, placing 22nd in a field of 26 songs.

Track listing

Charts

Weekly charts

Release history

References

2015 albums